"P.Y.T. (Pretty Young Thing)" is a song by the American singer Michael Jackson. It is the sixth single from Jackson's sixth solo album, Thriller (1982). The song was written by James Ingram and Quincy Jones.

"P.Y.T. (Pretty Young Thing)" was released on September 19, 1983. The single charted at number 10 on the Billboard Hot 100 and number 46 on the Hot Black Singles chart, becoming the sixth top 10 hit from the album. It reached number 11 on the UK Singles Chart. The single was most successful in Belgium, charting within the top 10 at number 6. The song has been covered and sampled by numerous artists, including Monica, Justin Guarini, and Kanye West. The original demo was also remixed by Black Eyed Peas singer will.i.am for Thriller 25.

"P.Y.T. (Pretty Young Thing)" was never performed live by Jackson. In a rehearsal for the Dangerous World Tour, however, Jackson sang a small part of the demo version, describing it as "something I wrote that I haven't recorded yet."

Background
Quincy Jones came up with the original title for the song after his wife, Peggy Lipton, brought lingerie with the words "pretty young thing" on it. From there, Jones asked several songwriters to write a song around the title. Jackson and musician Greg Phillinganes co-wrote and recorded a demo, which was presented to Jones by Phillinganes. That version is featured on The Ultimate Collection (2004). Jackson recalls that his version with Phillinganes wasn't what Jones was looking for. "Quincy wanted a fast song. Mine was mid-tempo." When James Ingram presented his demo, Jones said "that's it," and sent Ingram home to finish the lyrics. Jones then suggested they extend the bridge and add a chant section, resulting in Jones receiving a co-writer's credit. Jackson says he loved the version Ingram and Jones came up with, stating that he liked the "code" in the lyrics and the fact that words like "tenderoni" were fun rock 'n' roll-type words that couldn't be found in the dictionary.

Recording
Producer Quincy Jones allowed his long-time sound engineer Bruce Swedien to choose a large-diaphragm Shure SM7 dynamic microphone for Jackson's voice. The choice was unusual, as the microphone was more often seen in radio stations. For backing vocals, Swedien positioned Jackson at different distances from the microphone to record each track, to get a thicker sound.

James Ingram later described working with Jackson and Jones as being in The Wonderful Wizard of Oz. "It's almost like I got the chance to go to Oz and Quincy was the Wizard of Oz and Michael Jackson was who he was dealing with in his world. Their work ethic is unbelievable." He noted how Jones would fall asleep on the board, waking up to answer a question. "He works in the Alpha state a lot", Ingram added. Two of Jackson's sisters, Janet and La Toya, provided backing vocals in the guise of the P.Y.T.s. The two sisters sang "na na na" back at their brother towards the end of the song. According to the official sheet music at Musicnotes.com, "P.Y.T. (Pretty Young Thing)" is in the key of B minor. It has a tempo of 126 beats per minute, making it one of Jackson's fastest songs.

Release and reception
"P.Y.T. (Pretty Young Thing)" was released on September 19, 1983, as the sixth single from Thriller. The single charted at no. 10 on the Billboard Hot 100 and no. 46 on the Hot Black Singles chart, becoming the sixth Top 10 hit from Thriller. In the United Kingdom, the song reached a peak position of 11. It was most successful in Belgium, charting within the Top 10 at no. 6. The single was placed at no. 14 in the Netherlands. "P.Y.T. (Pretty Young Thing)" charted at number 24 in Canada and peaked at number 51 in Germany.

Response to "P.Y.T. (Pretty Young Thing)" was mixed to positive. Stephen Thomas Erlewine of AllMusic thought that it was "frizzy funk." Eric Henderson of Slant Magazine believed that "P.Y.T. (Pretty Young Thing)" was a "lush disco paradise." However, Rolling Stone reviewer Christopher Connelly, while discussing the album in a review, stated that the song "isn't up to the spunky character of the other tracks." Connelly mentioned that one of Jackson's weaknesses was "a tendency to go for the glitz," and cited the song as one example of this. Davitt Sigerson, from the same magazine, also agreed with Connelly, calling it one of Thrillers "forgettables". Jon Pareles of The New York Times called the song "fluff", and believed that the other songs from the album were what made Thriller such a hit.

P.Y.T. (Pretty Young Thing) 2008

For Thriller 25, The Black Eyed Peas frontman and producer will.i.am remixed the demo version of "P.Y.T. (Pretty Young Thing)" which Michael Jackson and Greg Phillinganes had co-written. The producer commented on Jackson and the project: "You always just dream of meeting him, let alone working with him. I wouldn't have believed it. I grew up in the projects in East Los Angeles and Thriller was filmed about two blocks from my house, but my mother was really strict and she wouldn't let me go to the factories—she didn't care who was filming a video there; but I'm on the 25th anniversary, 25 years later—that's pretty awesome." Entitled "P.Y.T. (Pretty Young Thing) 2008", the remix was well received by Rolling Stone. The publication described the track, along with "The Girl Is Mine 2008", as being one of the best songs on the album. They noted that will.i.am "updates the songs' original sound to make them dancefloor-worthy 25 years after their release."

Personnel
Written, composed and arranged by James Ingram and Quincy Jones
Produced by Quincy Jones
Michael Jackson – lead and backing vocals
Greg Phillinganes – synthesizer, synthesizer programming
Michael Boddicker – Roland VP-330 vocoder, E-mu Emulator
James Ingram – Portasound keyboard
Paul Jackson Jr. – guitars
Louis Johnson – electric bass
N'dugu Chancler – drums
Michael Jackson, Louis Johnson, Greg Phillinganes, James Ingram, Steven Ray – handclaps
P.Y.T.'s:
Janet Jackson
La Toya Jackson
Becky Lopez
Bunny Hull
Mindy Cohn
Additional background vocals:
James Ingram
Howard Hewett

Track listing45 RPMA-side
"P.Y.T (Pretty Young Thing)" – 3:59
B-side
"Workin' Day and Night" (Live-Jacksons) – 4:26Disco single'''
A-side
"P.Y.T (Pretty Young Thing)" – 3:59
B-side
"This Place Hotel" – 4:41
"Thriller" (Instrumental) – 5:56

Official versions
Album Version – 3:59
Demo Version – 3:47
2008 Remix with will.i.am – 4:21

Charts
Weekly charts

Year-end charts

Certifications

Cover versions and references to the song
2002: American Idol runner-up Justin Guarini sang "P.Y.T. (Pretty Young Thing)" on the first season of the show.
2007: A part of the lyrics to Justice's "D.A.N.C.E." refer to Jackson's song, and are said to be in homage to the singer.
2011: The song is performed in the twelfth episode, "Silly Love Songs", of the second season of musical television series Glee, by character Artie Abrams (played by Kevin McHale).
2012: The Wood Brothers performed a version of the song for The A.V. Clubs A.V. Undercover series.
2017: John Gibbons covered and remixed "P.Y.T (Pretty Young Thing)". It has so far charted at number 12 on the UK Dance Singles Chart number 1 on the Indie Singles Chart and number 22 on the Scottish Singles Chart.

Sampling
2002: "P.Y.T. (Pretty Young Thing)" was both sampled and interpolated on Monica's single "All Eyez on Me". "We used vocals from the song that didn't make the Thriller album", stated producer Rodney Jerkins. "He [Jackson] had more vocals and ad-libs that were never heard, and we used the ones that were not heard." Jackson hand-delivered his original masters to Monica, who, as a longtime Jackson fan, was touched by the move.
2003: The chorus of "P.Y.T. (Pretty Young Thing)" was sampled by rapper Memphis Bleek on "I Wanna Love U". The song, sung by Donell Jones, featured on Bleek's M.A.D.E. album.
2007: "P.Y.T. (Pretty Young Thing)" was also sampled on rapper Kanye West's "Good Life", the third single from his Graduation'' album.

Notes

References

Bibliography

External links
Genius: P.Y.T. (Pretty Young Thing) - Lyrics

1982 songs
1983 singles
Epic Records singles
Michael Jackson songs
Song recordings produced by Michael Jackson
Song recordings produced by Quincy Jones
Song recordings produced by will.i.am
Songs written by James Ingram
Songs written by Quincy Jones
Songs written by will.i.am
CDB (band) songs
Will.i.am songs